Anita Singh Gurjar is an Indian politician and a leader of Bharatiya Janata Party. She is elected to Rajasthan Legislative Assembly from Nagar constituency in Bharatpur district. She has studied B Sc and LLB.

References

Living people
People from Bharatpur district
1971 births
Rajasthan MLAs 2013–2018
Women in Rajasthan politics
21st-century Indian women politicians
21st-century Indian politicians
Rajasthan MLAs 2008–2013
Bharatiya Janata Party politicians from Rajasthan